Bradina sordidalis is a moth in the family Crambidae. It was described by Hermann Dewitz in 1881. It is found in Cameroon, Equatorial Guinea and Nigeria.

References

Moths described in 1881
Bradina